Samantharam is a 1985 Malayalam film by John C. Sankaramangalam. Soorya, Babu Namboothiri, Sai Das and Balan play the lead roles.

Plot
Susan and Jose are students of the post-graduate course in the university. They fall in love and decide to get married. The political scene in the university is turbulent. Once, Susan and Jose happen to witness the death of one of their collegemates in the hands of a group of students. When the police enquiries begin, Jose tries to wash his hands by denying his knowledge about the murder. This creates disturbances in Susan's relation with Jose. Susan's admiration to Mohan, her teacher and the leader of a students union, creates suspicions in Jose's mind also. But eventually, they do get married. Jose gets a job in a factory and the couple move to Trivandrum. Meanwhile, Mohan, who has been fired from the university becomes a union leader in Trivandrum. His works bring him in contact with the workers in the factory where Jose works, and Jose watches his association with the workers with distrust and disdain. Initially, Susan is happy in her new home in Trivandrum. But things start changing when Jose starts a secret relation with his mentor Varkey's daughter Bindu. Whenever she complains, Jose is rude to her. Meanwhile, Mohan makes occasional visits to Jose's house but Jose rudely sends him away. Susan goes to meet Mohan outside her home. One day, while Susan was awaiting Jose to join her for the Christmas Eve dinner, Jose rushes home and beats her up and orders her to get out of the house. Susan, completely shattered, cannot bear the situation. There is no way left for her to extricate herself from the sordid relationship except death. She contemplates suicide. At this moment, Mohan runs into the house, wounded in an encounter with the police. Susan appeals to Bindu to dress up Mohan's wound. The strange confrontation between the two women leads to a change of heart in Bindu. She becomes aware of her own selfishness, and is ashamed of her previous ruthless behavior in continuing her affair with Jose in defiance of Susan and her feelings. With Susan's help, Mohan vanishes into the night, escaping his relentless pursuers. Mohan's dramatic appearance, and Susan's encounter with Bindu, leaves her completely exhausted. Even death seems far away now. The film ends with Susan stepping out of her home and walking towards an unknown destination.

Cast
 Soorya as Susan 
 Babu Namboothiri as Jose
 Sai Das as Mohan
 Balan as Varkey

References

External links
 Samantharam at the Malayalam Movie Database
 Samantharam at Cinemalayalam.net

1980s Malayalam-language films
Films directed by John Sankaramangalam